Walcott is a small village and civil parish in the North Kesteven district of Lincolnshire, England. The population of the civil parish at the 2011 census was 566.

History
According to A Dictionary of British Place Names, Walcott is derived from the Old English 'walh' with 'cot', which means "cottage(s) of the Britons".

In the Domesday Book account the settlement is written as "Walecote", and was in the Langoe Hundred of Kesteven. In 1086 Walcott contained twenty-five households, seven freemen and two smallholders, land for four plough teams, and a  meadow. In 1066 lordship of the manor was held by Hemming of Branston, this transferred to Walter D'Aincourt in 1086, who was also Tenant-in-chief to William I.

The Gilbertine Catley Priory of St Mary was founded between 1146 and 1154; and dissolved in 1538. No sign of the priory can now be seen, but the site is scheduled.

Walcott is recorded in the 1872 White's Directory as a hamlet of Billinghay parish, part the Langoe wapentake, and near the Car Dyke navigation. The fenland between the hamlet and the Witham had been enclosed in 1799 and was "well drained and cultivated". The land was in the possession of various local families, but had been, between 1780 and 1787, held by William Fitzwilliam, 4th Earl Fitzwilliam. An "ancient" St Oswald's chapel of ease began decaying in 1776, and was replaced in 1852 by a new chapel, built by subscription in Early English style, the curacy of which was attached to Billinghay vicarage. A Wesleyan chapel had been built in 1820.

In 1817 "several" tumuli were found, one of them containing coffins and human bones. About half a mile west of the hamlet was reported the former Catley Priory, founded by Peter de Billinghay during the 12th-century reign of King Steven for nuns and brethren of the Gilbertine Order, and which at the 16th-century Suppression of the Monasteries was given to Robert Carre of Sleaford.

Trades listed at Walcott in 1872 included two shoemakers, two joiners, one of whom was also a wheelwright, a blacksmith, and a cattle salesman. There were thiry-six farmers, one of whom was also a grocer, draper & baker, another also a draper, one running a beerhouse, one a butcher, and one also the licensed victualler of the Black Horse public house. There were two beerhouse licensees, one of whom was also a carrier; he and a further carrier—transporter by wagon of goods and occasionally people between centres of trade—operated between the village and both Sleaford and Lincoln.

Community
The parish church is a Grade II listed building of red brick dedicated to Saint Oswald and built in 1852. It was presumably named after a previous chapel at Walcott, dedicated to Saint Oswald, and given by King John to Spalding Priory. The previous chapel stood in the centre of the village and was pulled down around 1790

The countryside around Walcott is of agricultural use, with sheep farming and the growing of potatoes being prominent.

References

External links

 Village Hall website

Villages in Lincolnshire
Civil parishes in Lincolnshire
North Kesteven District